The 1996 Korean Professional Football League was the 14th season of K League since its establishment in 1983. South Korean government and the Korean Professional Football Federation introduced a decentralization policy to proliferate the popularity of football nationally in preparation for the 2002 FIFA World Cup, which they wanted to host, so some clubs located in the capital Seoul (LG Cheetahs, Ilhwa Chunma) moved to other cities according to the new policy in this season.

Regular season

First stage

Second stage

Championship playoffs

Summary

Final table

Awards

Main awards

Best XI

Source:

See also
 1996 K League Championship
 1996 Korean League Cup
 1996 Korean FA Cup

References

External links
 RSSSF

K League seasons
1
South Korea
South Korea